Qońirat district (Karakalpak: Қоңырат районы, Qońırat rayonı) is a district of the Republic of Karakalpakstan. The capital lies at Qońirat (Kungrad).

The district contains one city Qońirat, five towns Jasliq, Altinkól, Qiriq qiz (Aqsholaq), Elabat, Qaraqalpaqstan and twelve rural communities Ádebiyat, Ájiniyaz, Qońirat, Qańli, Órnek, Rawshan, Súyenli, Ustyurt, Xorezm, Kókdarya, Miynetabat and Qipshaq.

References

Karakalpakstan
Districts of Uzbekistan